Oleg III Svyatoslavich (c. 1147–1204) was a Rus' prince (a member of the Rurik dynasty). His baptismal name was Feodosy. He was prince of Vshchizh (1166–before 1175), of Novgorod-Seversk (1200–1201), and of Chernigov (1201/1202–1204).

His life
He was the second son of Grand Prince Svyatoslav Vsevolodovich of Kiev and Maria Vasilkovna of Polotsk.

Under the year 1166, the chronicler reports that the daughter of Prince Andrey Yuryevich of Suzdalia, who had married Oleg, died. Circumstantial evidence shows that the Oleg in question was the son of Svyatoslav Vsevolodovich. On an undisclosed date, Oleg remarried a Ryazan princess; his father-in-law Yury Rostislavich was the younger brother of Prince Gleb Rostislavich of Ryazan.

In the spring of 1166, Prince Svyatoslav Vladimirovich of Vshchizh died, and his domain passed to the closest living relatives, the Olgovichi (the ruling dynasty of Chernigov). Oleg’s father, as the senior prince of the Olgovichi, held the authority to allocate the dead prince’s domains, and he gave Vshchizh to one of his sons; one view is, probably correctly, that the son was Oleg.

In 1175, his father accompanied Mikhalko and Vsevolod Yuryevich, who had been invited by the townspeople of Suzdal to be their prince, to the town. After his victory over the opponents of the Yuryevichi, Svyatoslav Vsevolodovich ordered Oleg to escort their wives from Chernihiv to Moscow. Shortly afterwards, Oleg went to his domain of Lopasna in the northeast corner of the Vyatichi lands. From there, he sent troops northeast to Svirilsk and captured it because it belonged to the Olgovichi. Gleb Rostislavich of Ryazan sent his nephew (Oleg’s brother-in-law) to recapture it, but Oleg defeated him. In the winter of 1177, Svyatoslav Vsevolodovich sent his sons Oleg and Vladimir to help Prince Vsevolod Yuryevich of Suzdal attack Prince Gleb Rostislavich of Ryazan.

On 12 May 1185 the Cumans defeated the troops led by Prince Igor Svyatoslavich of Novgorod-Seversk at the Kayala River. After learning of his cousin’s defeat, Svyatoslav Vsevolodovich sent Oleg and his elder brother, Vladimir to the Poseme region to serve as interim defenders of the Seversk towns. The information that he sent two sons suggests that he ordered them to occupy Rylsk and Putivl, which had recently lost their princes. Their main task would have been to close the “gates into the land of Rus’”. According to the chronicler, the Cumans assembled their entire nation to march against Rus’, but the khans argued, and because they obstinately stuck to their views, they split their horde into two. One of the hordes attacked Putivl but failed to take it; nevertheless, the Cumans set fire to its outer town, pillaged the district, and razed surrounding villages. After the Cumans pillaged the region, Oleg and Vladimir departed from Putivl and Rylsk. When, in 1188, his father and Prince Rurik Rostislavich of Belgorod waged war against the Hungarians who had occupied Halych, Oleg and his brothers rode with their father. 

Olegs’s father died during the last week of July 1194; his death changed the order of seniority among the Olgovichi: his only brother, Yaroslav Vsevolodovich became the new senior prince of the dynasty, and Oleg and his brothers became answerable to their uncle. When Vsevolod Yuryevich (accompanied by the princes of Ryazan, Murom, and the Cumans) attacked the principality of Chernihiv in 1196, Oleg was placed, together with his brother Gleb, in charge of defending Chernihiv against Rurik Rostislavich.

In March 1196, his uncle sent troops to attack Prince Vasilko Bryacheslavich of Vitebsk and appointed Oleg as commander-in-chief. Before reaching Vitebsk, his troops pillaged the lands of Smolensk. Prince David Rostislavich of Smolensk retaliated by sending his nephew Mstislav Romanovich, the Smolensk militia, and other troops to confront the invaders. The two sides clashed and Mstislav Romanovich defeated Oleg’s troops; Oleg’s son David fell in the fray. Meanwhile, the Smolensk militia marched against the princes of Polotsk who had come to Oleg’s assistance; but the townsmen fled without engaging in the battle. On seeing that Oleg and his troops had been routed, the Polotsk forces hurried to his aid and defeated Mstislav Romanovich’s men. When the latter, who had left the battlefield to pursue Oleg, returned, the Polotsk princes took him captive; later, Mstislav Romanovich was handed over into Oleg’s custody. Oleg sent word to his uncle and advised him to set out for Smolensk, but Rurik Rostislavich sent messengers to intercept Yaroslav Vsevolodovich, who returned to Chernihiv after hearing Rurik Rostislavich’s threat.

In autumn 1200 his brother, Vladimir Svyatoslavich died and thus Oleg became the second in precedence in the dynasty after Igor Svyatoslavich (his father’s cousin), and it was also his turn to rule Novgorod Seversk. In the spring of 1201, Igor Svyatoslavich, the prince of Chernigov died, and the office of senior prince passed to Oleg, and thus he occupied Chernihiv. 

Shortly afterwards, Grand Prince Rurik Rostislavich of Kiev summoned the Olgovichi to campaign against Roman Mstislavich of Volodymyr who had begun wreaking havoc on domains belonging to him. Oleg decided to cooperate with Rurik Rostislavich and pledged loyalty to him. The Kievans, however, opened the gates of the podol to Roman Mstislavich, who forced Oleg and Rurik Rostislavich to capitulate, and the Olgovichi returned to Chernihiv.

Rurik Rostislavich and the Olgovichi captured Kiev on 2 January 1203; the former avenged himself against the Kievans for opening the gates to Roman Mstislavich, and he ordered his men to set fire to the podol where the townsmen had betrayed him. The troops plundered the Cathedral of St. Sofia, the Tithe Church, and all the monasteries. Rurik Rostislavich and Oleg seized the garments of the blessed first Christian princes of Rus’; their objective, undoubtedly, was to adorn their own cathedrals with them. By hanging the robes in their throne rooms, however, they may have also hoped to buttress their dynasties’ claims to the capital of Rus’. Nevertheless, Rurik Rostislavich had no intention of occupying Kiev, and thus Oleg’s younger brother Vsevolod Svyatoslavich occupied the town.

Since Roman Mstislavich’s raids had provoked Rurik Rostislavich and the Olgovichi to despoil Kiev, he took it upon himself to restore peace; he therefore asked Vsevolod Yuryevich of Suzdalia to be pacified with the Olgovichi, which occurred in February 1203. On 16 February, after Roman Mstislavich himself also concluded peace with the Olgovichi, he marched against Rurik Rostislavich who submitted to him and to Vsevolod Yuryevich promising to sever relations with the Olgovichi and the Cumans.

In 1203, Oleg defeated 1,700 Lithuanians; it is plausible that he attacked the Lithuanians in order to help the princes of Polotsk, but the possibility remains that he attacked them in defense of the Dregovichi domains. Under the year 1204, a number of chronicles state that Oleg died, while others add that his son died with him. They probably fell in battle against the Lithuanians.

Marriages and children
Oleg III married his first wife before 1166. She was a daughter of Prince Andrey Yuryevich of Suzdalia and his Cuman wife and may have been named Euphrosyne.

Oleg's second wife was a daughter of Prince Prince Yuriy Rostislavich of Ryazan and may have been named Euphrosyne.

Oleg had three children: one whose name is unknown (died in 1204), a son named David (died in 1196), and a son named Ingor (died between 1211 and 1223).

Footnotes

Sources
Dimnik, Martin: The Dynasty of Chernigov - 1146-1246; Cambridge University Press, 2003, Cambridge; .

12th-century princes in Kievan Rus'
Olgovichi family
Princes of Chernigov
Eastern Orthodox monarchs